Ram Lakhan Singh Yadav (3 March 1920 – 16 January 2006) was an Indian politician. He was elected to the 10th Lok Sabha, lower house of the Parliament of India from the Arrah, Bihar in 1991 as a member of the Janata Dal but joined the Congress in controversial circumstances which helped save Narasimha Rao Government in the 28 July 1993 no confidence vote. He was later made Minister for Chemicals and Fertilizers in the Narasimha Rao Government.

He was earlier Member of the Bihar Legislative Assembly and a state minister. He first became a Cabinet Minister in 1963 in K.B. Sahay ministry. He was accorded the third place in the ministry after Sahey and his deputy Satendra Narain Singh. A veteran freedom fighter, Shri Yadav was a key figure from Bihar in India's freedom struggle. His younger grandson Jai Vardhan Yadav was elected Member of Legislative Assembly from Paliganj as a member of Rashtriya Janata Dal in between 2015 and 2020.

Political journey 
Ram Lakhan Singh Yadav was a Member of the Tenth Lok Sabha from 1991 to 1996, representing Arrah Parliamentary Constituency of Bihar. Shri Yadav was a Minister of Chemicals and Fertilisers from 1994 to 1996. Earlier, Shri Yadav was a Member of the Bihar Legislative Assembly from 1952 to 1991. He was the chairman, Nivedan Samiti, Bihar Legislative Assembly from 1986 to 1989. He was also the Cabinet Minister, Public Works Department, Public Health Engineering and Home Guards, Land Revenue, Land Reforms, Rehabilitation and Relief in the State Government. During the 1990s, Ram Lakhan Singh Yadav was the undisputed leader of Yadavs in Bihar. He is until date regarded as one of the tallest Yadav leaders of all times in Bihar and an icon.

Contributions as a philanthropist and educationist 
An agriculturist by profession, Yadav was an active social worker. He served as the chairman, Bihar Art Theatre from 1981 to 1985 and as the chairman and Secretary of various cultural organisations in Patna. He was the founder of more than 100 educational institutions and cultural centres in Bihar. He contributed to organising students, labour unions, backward classes, freedom fighters and Kisan Sabha. In an interview to India Today, he is quoted to have said, "For me the farmer comes first. And I am willing to sacrifice anything for him. For the farmer, whatever I have to do, I will do."

Attributed State-run Institutions and Monuments
RLSY College, Paliganj
RLSY College Anisabad, Patna
RLSY College Aurangabad, Bihar
RLSY College, Bakhtiyarpur, Patna, Bihar
Ram Lakhan Singh Yadav College,  Ranchi, Jharkhand
RLSY College, Nalanda –  Bihar Sharif, Bihar
Ram Lakhan Singh Yadav Inter College, Koderma
Ram Lakhan Singh Yadav College (RLSY), Bettiah
Ram Lakhan Singh Yadav College - Kharkhura, Gaya
RLSY College, Nawada

References

External links
 Official Biographical Sketch in Lok Sabha Website

1920 births
2006 deaths
India MPs 1991–1996
Lok Sabha members from Bihar
Members of the Bihar Legislative Assembly
Rao administration
People from Arrah
Leaders of the Opposition in the Bihar Legislative Assembly
Indian National Congress politicians
Janata Dal politicians
People from Patna
Indian National Congress (U) politicians